Edgar Smith (born 12 January 1950) is a Canadian rower. He competed at the 1972 Summer Olympics and the 1976 Summer Olympics.

References

External links
 

1950 births
Living people
Canadian male rowers
Olympic rowers of Canada
Rowers at the 1972 Summer Olympics
Rowers at the 1976 Summer Olympics
Sportspeople from British Columbia
Pan American Games medalists in rowing
Pan American Games bronze medalists for Canada
Rowers at the 1971 Pan American Games
People from Comox, British Columbia